West Shore School District, is a large, suburban, public school district with its main office located in Lewisberry, Pennsylvania. This district serves students in eastern Cumberland County and northern York County. It serves the municipalities of Lemoyne, New Cumberland and Wormleysburg boroughs and Lower Allen Township in Cumberland County; Goldsboro and Lewisberry boroughs, Fairview Township and Newberry Township in York County. According to 2000 federal census data, the District served a resident population of 57,960 people. By 2010, the district's population increased to 62,514 people.

According to the Pennsylvania Budget and Policy Center, 26 of the District's pupils lived at 185% or below the Federal Poverty Level  as shown by their eligibility for the federal free or reduced price school meal programs in 2012. In 2009, the District residents' per capita income was $24,740, while the median family income was $57,500. In the Commonwealth, the median family income was $49,501 and the United States median family income was $49,445, in 2010. In York County, the median household income was $57,494. By 2013, the median household income in the United States rose to $52,100.

Based on enrollment, the school district is the largest serving Cumberland County and one of the largest in the greater Harrisburg metropolitan area. It was formed in 1966 from four small Cumberland County districts and one school district in York County. About 58 percent of the district's students come from York County, with the remaining 42 percent coming from Cumberland County. Eighty percent of the district's area resides in York County.

West Shore School District operates two high schools (grades 9–12). Most students from Cumberland County attend Cedar Cliff High School and most of the York County students attend Red Land High School. The district also operates three middle schools (grades 6–8), and ten elementary schools (grades K-5).

Schools

Cedar Cliff High School Principal: Dr. Kevin Fillgrove
Red Land High School Principal: Melissa Herbert
Allen Middle School Principal: Brian Granger
New Cumberland Middle School Principal: Christian D'Annibale
Crossroads Middle School Principal: Christopher Konieczy
Washington Heights Elementary School Principal: Michelle Trevino
Red Mill Elementary School Principal: Ryan Deveney
Newberry Elementary School Principal: Travis Peck
Lower Allen/Rossmoyne Elementary Schools Principal: Christopher Stine
Hillside Elementary School Principal: Julie Dougherty
Highland Elementary School Principal: Meghan Sheraw
Fishing Creek Elementary School Principal: Lisa Crum
Fairview Elementary School Principal: 

Herman Avenue and Washington Heights were sisters schools up until 2000; Herman Avenue was grades k-2, and Washington Heights was grades 3-4. Washington Heights is now k-5. Lower Allen and Rossmoyne Elementary Schools are connected; Lower Allen is grades k-2, and Rossmoyne is grades 3–5, as Mount Zion and Fairview Elementary Schools once were. Fairview Elementary School is now k-5.

Extracurriculars
West Shore School District offers a variety of clubs, activities and an extensive sports program.

Sports
The District funds:

Cedar Cliff High School

Boys
Baseball – AAAA
Basketball – AAAA
Cross Country – AAA
Football – AAAA
Golf – AAA
Soccer – AAA
Swimming and Diving – AAA
Tennis – AAA
Track and Field – AAA
Volleyball – AAA
Wrestling – AAA
Marching Band – Tournament of Bands Chapter VI and USBands (Offered to 8th graders as well)

Girls
Basketball – AAAA
Cross Country – Class AAA
Field Hockey – AAA
Golf – AAA
Soccer (Fall) – AAA
Softball – AAAA
Swimming and Diving – AAA
Girls' Tennis – AAA
Track and Field – AAA
Volleyball – AAA
Marching Band – Tournament of Bands Chapter VI and USBands (Offered To 8th graders as well)

Red Land High School

Boys
Baseball – AAAA
Basketball – AAAA
Cross Country- AAA
Football – AAA
Golf – AAA
Soccer – AAA
Swimming and Diving – AAA
Tennis – AAA
Track and Field – AAA
Volleyball – AA
Wrestling – AAA
Marching Band – Tournament of Bands Chapter VI and USBands (Offered to 8th graders as well)

Girls
Basketball – AAAA
Cross Country – AAA
Field Hockey – AAA
Golf – AAA
Soccer (Fall) – AAA
Softball – AAAA
Swimming and Diving – AAA
Girls' Tennis – AAA
Track and Field – AAA
Volleyball – AAA
Marching Band – Tournament of Bands Chapter VI and USBands (Offered to 8th graders as well)

Middle Schools:

Boys
Basketball
Cross Country
Football
Soccer
Track and Field
Wrestling
Marching Band- (Offered to 8th graders only)

Girls
Basketball
Cross Country
Field Hockey
Track and Field
Softball
Marching Band (Offered to 8th graders only)

According to PIAA directory July 2012 

On March 19, 2015, the West Shore School District school board voted 6–2 to combine the Cedar Cliff and Red Land marching bands, to make West Shore Marching Band. It is under the direction of Robert Starrett (band director at Red Land), Eric Graybill (band director at Cedar Cliff), and George Clements (band director at Allen Middle School).

Closed Schools

Lemoyne Middle School
The West Shore School Board voted unanimously to close Lemoyne Middle School in June 2013 to deal with budget constraints. Students were reassigned to the remaining 3 middle schools in the District.

Mount Zion Elementary School
Mount Zion Elementary School was a grade k-2 school located in Lewisberry, Pennsylvania, Fairview Township. After completing second grade, students would continue to third grade at Fairview Elementary School.

In January 2012, the members of the school board proposed the closure of Mount Zion Elementary School, to help save the district's budget. In Spring 2012, the final vote was made to close Mount Zion after the end of the school year. Since its close, the district temporarily placed its students and incoming students of that area to other elementary schools in the district, until expansions at Fairview Elementary School were Complete. Fairview Elementary School now serves as a k-5 elementary school.

References

External links
 West Shore School District

School districts established in 1966
Susquehanna Valley
Education in Harrisburg, Pennsylvania
School districts in York County, Pennsylvania
School districts in Cumberland County, Pennsylvania
1966 establishments in Pennsylvania